Radioactive (also known as Radioactive: Amazing and Mystifying Chemical Tricks) is the second studio album and major label debut by American rapper Yelawolf. It was released on November 21, 2011 through Shady Records and Interscope Records.

Recording
Recording sessions took place at Las Vegas Valley, Nevada in two weeks.

Music composition, style, and lyrics
Radioactive covers many different styles of hip hop fusions, being alternative hip hop as principal musical genre. Hardcore hip hop is represented on the tracks "Radioactive Introduction", "Throw It Up", "Get Away", and "Slumerican Shitizen". A horrorcore rap style is used in "Growin' Up in the Gutter", whereas "Hard White (Up in the Club)" is a crunk party track. "Let's Roll", "Write Your Name", and "Radio" follow a pop rap style, with catchy hooks and beats. "Animal" is a fast-paced hip hop party track with a dubstep influenced beat. "Good Girl" utilizes an R&B-tinged feel, while "The Hardest Love Song in the World" is a g-funk hip hop track. Yelawolf covers a variety of lyrical themes in these album, from gangsta rap lyrics in "Get Away" and "Throw It Up", to more conscious and slightly political tracks such as "Made in the USA", "Slumerican Shitizen", "Write Your Name", and "The Last Song". "Radio" is about the internet taking over how music and music videos are received by fans. It also refers to radio stations playing the same songs constantly and singers being discovered via the internet. The song contains several references to rock and rap artists and their songs from the past."Write your Name"  is produced by J.U.S.T.I.C.E. League With samples from the Reza Pishro "Tehran". The album's final track, titled "The Last Song" described as very personal about Yelawolf's life, and it's a very emotional final letter to his absent biological father and talks about other past struggles.

Singles
The album's first single "Hard White (Up in the Club)" was released on August 8, 2011. The song features guest vocals by Lil Jon and it was produced by Hydrox. The music video was filmed in Atlanta, Georgia, and directed by Motion Family. On September 20, the music video for "Hard White (Up in the Club)" was released through VEVO. The remix to "Hard White (Up in the Club)" was released on November 2; the song features T.I., and label-mates Slaughterhouse.

On October 28, 2011, Yelawolf released the album's second single "Let's Roll" featuring Kid Rock. The song was produced by The Audibles, Mr. Pyro, and Eminem.

Other songs
The track, titled "No Hands" was featured on the video game Driver: San Francisco. Yelawolf partnered up to release the music video with Ubisoft and Complex. The music video was filmed at several major landmarks in San Francisco, California, and directed by Erick Peyton, who is well known for his direction on Snoop Dogg's music video for his song "That Tree". The song did not make it on the album.

Yelawolf filmed a 12-minute short horror film for the track "Growin' Up in the Gutter", which features rapper Rittz. Although the track was not released as a single the short film finally premiered on July 4. It was directed by Tyler Clinton and Yelawolf credited as Michael Wayne for Slumerican, the short film was titled "Gutter".

Critical reception

Radioactive has received generally positive reviews from music critics. Before release, the album was noted by the influential hip-hop magazine The Source as being a near classic, with a 4.5/5 rating. At Metacritic the album received an average score of 62 out of 100, based on 16 reviews. Acclaimed Hip-hop magazine XXL gave the album a 4/5 (XL) rating, saying "more than not, the album is a standout effort that introduces the full-range of his talents as an MC with crafty songwriting abilities and deft ear for a sonic palette". Prefix Magazine stated that it was "hard to view Radioactive in any context that doesn’t label it as a total artistic failure" and that Yelawolf was "rolling over to commercial demands". PopMatters echoed this sentiment, calling the album a "misguided grasp at populism" and criticising Yelawolf's willingness to "play second fiddle" to A&R demands. Complex Magazine rated Radioactive as #18 in the 25 Best Albums of 2011. Noted hip hop magazine XXL, Radioactive was ranked at number 10 of the best albums of 2011.

Commercial performance
The album debuted at number 27 on the US Billboard 200, with 41,000 copies sold in its first week. It has sold 208,000 copies in the US as of April 2015.

Track listing 

Notes
 signifies a co-producer
 signifies an additional producer
"Radioactive Introduction" features background vocals by Nikkiya.
"Let's Roll" features background vocals by Herschel Boone.
"The Hardest Love Song in the World" features uncredited vocals by Poo Bear.
"Radio" features uncredited vocals by Danny Morris.
"In This World" features uncredited vocals by Eminem.

Sample credits
"Get Away" contains elements of "Strawberry Letter 23", written by Shuggie Otis, and samples of the same performed by The Brothers Johnson.
"The Hardest Love Song in the World" contains elements of "Always Together", written by Bobby Miller, and samples of the same performed by The Dells.
"Everything I Love The Most" contains elements of "The Stranger", written and performed by Billy Joel.
"In This World" contains elements of "Is There Any Love", written by Paul Zaza and Trevor Dandy, and samples of the same performed by Trevor Dandy.

Charts

Weekly charts

Year-end charts

Personnel
Credits for Radioactive adapted from Allmusic.

Ray Alba – publicity
The Audibles – producer
Matt Barrett – guitar
Blaqsmurph – drums, keyboard programming, piano, producer
Herschel Boone – background vocals
Borgore – producer, programming
Leslie Brathwaite – mixing
Tyler Clinton – cover art
Regina Davenport – A&R, production coordination
Archie Davis – A&R
Cristian DeLano – engineer
Lionel Deluy – photography
Ben Didelot – bass
Diplo – producer, programming
Fefe Dobson – composer
Seneca Doss – marketing
Eminem – additional production, executive producer, mixing, producer, vocal
Finatik – percussion
Finatik N Zac – programming
John Fisher – management
Brian "Big Bass" Gardner – mastering
Jimmy Giannos – drum programming, programming
Matthew Hayes – engineer, mixing
Matt Huber – assistant
Joe Strange – mixing assistant
Irvin Johnson – assistant
Jeremy "J Dot" Jones – management
Jim Jonsin – percussion, producer, programming
Dominic Jordan – drum programming, keyboards, programming
J.U.S.T.I.C.E. League – producer, programming
David Karmiol – guitar
Emanuel Kiriakou – bass, drums, editing, engineer, keyboard programming, producer
Dave Kutch – mastering

Marc Labelle – project coordinator
Robert Marks – mixing
Nikolas Marzouca – engineer
Marshall Mathers – composer
Tristan McClain – engineer
Riggs Morales – A&R
Danny Morris – composer, keyboards
Mona Moua – vocals
Mr. Pyro – producer
Brian Nelson – watercolor artwork
Nikkiya Brooks – background vocals
T.W. Pentz – composer
Phonix Beats – engineer, producer, programming
Poo Bear – producer
Kawan "KP" Prather – A&R, composer, executive producer
Michael Pratt – assistant
Priscilla Renea – vocals
Luis Resto – keyboards
Courtney Sills – composer, management
Sasha Sirota – bass, editing, drums, engineer, producer, guitar
Muzzy Solis – assistant
Mike Strange – engineer, mixing, mixing engineer
Al Sutton	 – engineer
Tha Hydrox – instrumentation, producer, programming
Andrew Van Meter – producer
Eric Weaver – assistant
Jason Wilkie – engineer
WLPWR – assistant, drum programming, instrumentation, producer, programming
Jason Wilson – assistant
Mike Wilson – engineer
Yelawolf – vocals
David Sammon – Yelawolf's Father
Salvatore Casto - Close Friend

References

2011 albums
Albums produced by Diplo
Albums produced by Emanuel Kiriakou
Albums produced by Eminem
Albums produced by Jim Jonsin
Albums produced by J.U.S.T.I.C.E. League
Albums produced by WLPWR
Shady Records albums
Yelawolf albums